The Jacques Deruyts Prize, or Prix Jacques Deruyts, is a monetary prize that recognizes distinguished research contributions in Mathematics.   It was first awarded in 1952 by the Académie Royale de Belgique, Classe des Sciences and is named for Jacques Deruyts (full name Deruyts, Joseph Gustave Jacques) who was a Belgian mathematician, known as a pioneer of group representation theory.

Deruyts received his doctorate in 1883 from the University of Liège

Recipients 
The recipients of the Jacques Deruyts Prize are:

 1952: Paul Gillis                   
 1956: Jean Teghem              
 1960: Félix Alardin               
 1964: No award
 1968: No award
 1972: Lucien Waelbroeck
 1976: Jean-Pierre Gossez
 1980: Paul Godin
 1984: Jean Schmets
 1988: Marc De Wilde                       
 1992: Christian Fabry 
 1996: Jean Bricmont 
 2000: Jean Schmets 
 2004: F. Thomas Bruss 
 2008: Thierry De Pauw
 2012: Denis Bonheure
 2016: Siegfried Hörmann
 2020: Jean Van Schaftingen

See also

 List of mathematics awards

References 

Mathematics awards